Let the Right One In may refer to:

 Let the Right One In (novel), a 2004 Swedish vampire fiction novel by John Ajvide Lindqvist
 Let the Right One In (2011 play), a play adapted from the 2004 novel by John Ajvide Lindqvist himself and directed by Jakob Hultcrantz Hansson 
 Let the Right One In (2013 play), a play adapted from the 2004 novel by Jack Thorne and directed by John Tiffany
 Let the Right One In (film), a 2008 Swedish film based on the novel
 Let Me In (film), a 2010 English-language film directed by Matt Reeves, based on both the novel and 2008 film
 Let the Right One In (TV series), a 2022 television series inspired by the novel
 "Let the Right One In", a 2009 song by the band Aiden from the album Knives
 "Let the Right One In" (The Vampire Diaries), a 2010 episode of the TV series The Vampire Diaries
 "Let the Right One Slip In", a 1988 song by Morrissey, from the album Viva Hate, which inspired the name of Lindqvist's novel
Let the Wrong One In, 2021 Irish horror comedy film